The 1966 Pittsburgh Panthers football team represented the University of Pittsburgh in the 1966 NCAA University Division football season.  The team compiled a 1–9 record under head coach Dave Hart. The team's statistical leaders included Ed James with 1,162 passing yards and Mike Raklewicz with 324 rushing yards.

Schedule

References

Pittsburgh
Pittsburgh Panthers football seasons
Pittsburgh Panthers football